Alan Dean Foster (born November 18, 1946) is an American writer of fantasy and science fiction. He has written several book series, more than 20 standalone novels, and many novelizations of film scripts.

Career

Star Wars
Foster was the ghostwriter of the original novelization of Star Wars, which was credited solely to George Lucas. When asked if it was difficult for him to see Lucas get all the credit for Star Wars, Foster said, "Not at all. It was George's story idea. I was merely expanding upon it. Not having my name on the cover didn't bother me in the least. It would be akin to a contractor demanding to have his name on a Frank Lloyd Wright house."

Foster also wrote the follow-up novel Splinter of the Mind's Eye (1978), written with the intention of being adapted as a low-budget sequel to Star Wars if the film was unsuccessful. However, Star Wars was a blockbusting success, and The Empire Strikes Back (1980) would be developed instead. Foster's story relied heavily on abandoned concepts that appeared in Lucas's early treatments for the first film.

Foster returned to the franchise for the prequel-era novel The Approaching Storm (2002), and also wrote the novelization of the first sequel trilogy film, The Force Awakens (2015).

Star Trek
Foster wrote 10 books based on episodes of the animated Star Trek, the first six books each consisting of three linked novella-length episode adaptations, and the last four being expanded adaptations of single episodes that segued into original story. In the mid-seventies, he wrote original Star Trek stories for the Peter Pan-label Star Trek audio story records. He has the story credit for Star Trek: The Motion Picture, as he wrote a treatment based in a two-page outline by Gene Roddenberry.

He later wrote the novelization of the 2009 film Star Trek, his first Star Trek novel in over 30 years, and for Star Treks sequel, Star Trek Into Darkness.

Dispute with Disney
In 2020, Foster, together with the Science Fiction and Fantasy Writers of America (SFWA), alleged that The Walt Disney Company, which acquired rights to his Star Wars and Alien novels via their acquisitions of Lucasfilm and 20th Century Fox, had not paid him royalties for e-book sales of his books. The issue was resolved in May 2021, when Disney arranged to pay Foster and his fellow Star Wars novelization authors James Kahn and Donald F. Glut their royalties.

Awards
Foster won the 2008 Grand Master award from the International Association of Media Tie-In Writers.

Bibliography

Humanx Commonwealth Universe

Pip and Flinx
Novels are listed in chronological order of the story (not chronological order of publication).  Foster comments, in a foreword to a re-issued edition of Bloodhype, that it is the eleventh novel in the series, and should fall between Running from the Deity and Trouble Magnet.

 For Love of Mother-Not (1983) 
 The Tar-Aiym Krang (1972) 
 Orphan Star (1977) 
 The End of the Matter (1977) 
 Flinx in Flux (1988) 
 Mid-Flinx (1995) 
 Reunion (2001) 
 Flinx's Folly (2003) 
 Sliding Scales (2004) 
 Running from the Deity (2005) 
 Bloodhype (1973) 
 Trouble Magnet (2006) 
 Patrimony (2007) 
 Flinx Transcendent (2009) 
 Strange Music (2017)

Founding of the Commonwealth
 Phylogenesis (1999) 
 Dirge (2000) 
 Diuturnity's Dawn (2002)

Icerigger Trilogy
 Icerigger (1974) 
 Mission to Moulokin (1979) 
 The Deluge Drivers (1987)

Standalone Commonwealth novels
In chronological order:
 Nor Crystal Tears (1982) 
 Voyage to the City of the Dead (1984) 
 Midworld (1975) 
 "The Emoman" (1972) short story
 "Surfeit" (1982) short story
 Drowning World (2003) 
 Quofum (2008) 
 "Mid-Death" (2006) short story
 The Howling Stones (1997) 
 Sentenced to Prism (1985) 
 Cachalot (1980)

The Damned Trilogy
 A Call to Arms (1991) 
 The False Mirror (1992) 
 The Spoils of War (1993)

Dinotopia Universe
 Dinotopia Lost (1996) 
 The Hand of Dinotopia (1997)

Journeys of the Catechist
 Carnivores of Light and Darkness (1998) 
 Into the Thinking Kingdoms (1999) 
 A Triumph of Souls (2000)

Marexx
 Builder (unpublished)

Spellsinger series

 Spellsinger (1983) 
 The Hour of the Gate (1984) 
 The Day of the Dissonance (1984) 
 The Moment of the Magician (1984) 
 The Paths of the Perambulator (1985) 
 The Time of the Transference (1986) 
 Son of Spellsinger (1993) 
 Chorus Skating (1994) 
"Serenade" (2004), a novelette set immediately after The Time of the Transference, was first published in the anthology Masters of Fantasy and was later reprinted in Foster's short story collection Exceptions to Reality.

The Taken trilogy
 Lost and Found (2004) 
 The Light-Years Beneath My Feet (2005) 
 The Candle of Distant Earth (2005)

The Tipping Point trilogy
 The Human Blend (2010) 
 Body, Inc. (2012) 
 The Sum of Her Parts (2012)

Montezuma Strip
 Montezuma Strip (1995) 
 The Mocking Program (2002)

Standalone novels
 The Man Who Used the Universe (1983) 
 The I Inside (1984) 
 Slipt (1984) 
 Into the Out Of (1986) 
 Glory Lane (1987) 
 Maori (1988) 
 To the Vanishing Point (1988) 
 Quozl (1989) 
 Cyber Way (1990) 
 Cat-a-lyst (1991) 
 Codgerspace (1992) 
 Greenthieves (1994) 
 Design for Great-Day (1995) , with Eric Frank Russell)
 Life Form (1995) 
 Voyage of the Basset (Illustrated by James C. Christensen) (1996) 
 Jed the Dead (1997) 
 Parallelities (1998) 
 Primal Shadows (2001) 
 Interlopers (2001) 
 Kingdoms of Light (2001) 
 Sagramanda (2006) 
 Relic (2018)

Collections
 With Friends Like These ... (1977) 
 ... Who Needs Enemies? (1984) 
 The Metrognome and Other Stories (1990) 
 Mad Amos (1996) 
 Impossible Places (2002) 
 Exceptions to Reality (2008) 
 The Flavors of Other Worlds (2019) 
 The Taste of Different Dimensions (2019)

Anthologies edited
 Smart Dragons, Foolish Elves (1991) with Martin H. Greenberg
 Betcha Can't Read Just One (1993)
 Short Stories from Small Islands: Tales Shared in Palau (2005)

Novelizations

Star Trek universe

Star Trek: The Animated Series
 Star Trek Log One (1974) 
 Star Trek Log Two (1974) 
 Star Trek Log Three (1975) 
 Star Trek Log Four (1975) 
 Star Trek Log Five (1975) 
 Star Trek Log Six (1976) 
 Star Trek Log Seven (1976) 
 Star Trek Log Eight (1976) 
 Star Trek Log Nine (1977) 
 Star Trek Log Ten (1978)

Star Trek movies
 Star Trek: The Motion Picture (1979), story credit
 Star Trek (2009) , movie novelization
 Star Trek Into Darkness (2013) , movie novelization
 Star Trek: The Unsettling Stars (2020) , movie tie-in

Star Wars universe
 Star Wars: From the Adventures of Luke Skywalker (1976) , novelization of Star Wars ghost writing as George Lucas
 Splinter of the Mind's Eye (1978) 
 The Approaching Storm (2002) 
 Star Wars: The Force Awakens (2015), movie novelization
 "Bait" (2015), short story

Alien universe
 Alien (1979) 
 Aliens (1986) 
 Alien 3 (1992) 
 Alien: Covenant (2017) 
 Alien: Covenant - Origins (2017)

Terminator universe
 Terminator Salvation (2009) , movie novelization

Transformers
 Transformers (2007) 
 Transformers: Ghosts of Yesterday (2007) 
 Transformers: Revenge of the Fallen (2009) 
 Transformers: The Veiled Threat (2009)

Standalone novelizations
 Dark Star (1974) , movie novelization
 Luana (Italian film) (1974) , movie novelization
 Maude (unpublished 1974), television novelization ("Maude's Dilemma")
 The Black Hole (1979) , movie novelization
 Clash of the Titans (1981) , movie novelization
 Outland (1981) , movie novelization
 The Thing (1981) , movie novelization
 Krull (1983) , movie novelization
 The Last Starfighter (1984) , movie novelization
 The Last Starfighter Storybook (1984) with Lynn Haney and Jonathan Betuel
 Shadowkeep (1984) , also a computer game (1984)
 Starman (1984) , movie novelization
 Pale Rider (1985) , movie novelization
 The Dig (1995) , also a computer game
 The Chronicles of Riddick (2004) , movie novelization

Film and television storylines 
 Alien Nation (1988) , movie novelization
 Welcome to Paradox (1998, episode "Our Lady of the Machine")

References

External links 

 
 
 
 FYC Conversations with Alan Dean Foster (Part One), For Your Consideration podcast, September 2017
 FYC Conversations with Alan Dean Foster (Part Two), For Your Consideration podcast, October 2017

1946 births
20th-century American male writers
20th-century American novelists
21st-century American male writers
21st-century American novelists
American fantasy writers
American male novelists
American science fiction writers
Living people
Novelists from Arizona
Novelists from New York (state)
University of California, Los Angeles alumni
Writers from New York City
20th-century pseudonymous writers
21st-century pseudonymous writers
Ghostwriters